The Ministry of Justice of the Czech Republic is a government ministry of the Czech Republic.

The powers of the Ministry of Justice as defined by Section 11 of Act No. 2/1969 Coll. on Creation of Ministries and Other Central Authorities (Competencies Act) are:

It is a central authority of the state administration for courts of law and the Public Prosecutor's Office.

It gives legal opinion on credit and guarantee agreements, whose party is the Czech Republic.

It acts as a central authority of the state administration for prisons; the Prison Service of the Czech Republic is its subsidiary.

It acts as a central authority of the state administration for probation and mediation.

It represents the Czech Republic claims for breaching the Convention for the Protection of Human Rights and Fundamental Freedoms and its Protocols and the International Covenant on Civil and Political Rights and coordinates the execution of the decisions of the relevant international bodies.

List of ministers

Ministers of Justice for Czechoslovakia (1918-1968) 

 František Soukup: November 14, 1918 - July 8, 1919
 František Veselý: July 8, 1919 - May 25, 1920
Alfred Meissner: May 25, 1920 - September 15, 1920
 Augustin Popelka: September 15, 1920 - September 26, 1921
 Josef Dolanský: September 26, 1921 - December 9, 1925
 Karel Viškovský: 9 December 1925 - 18 March 1926
 Jiří Haussmann: March 18, 1926 - October 12, 1926
Robert Mayr-Harting: October 12, 1926 - December 7, 1929
Alfred Meissner: December 7, 1929 - February 14, 1934
Ivan Dérer: February 14, 1934 - September 22, 1938
 Vladimir Fajnor: 22 September 1938 - 4 October 1938 and 4 October 1938 - 14 October 1938
 Ladislav Karel Feierabend: October 14, 1938 - December 1, 1938
Jaroslav Krejci: 1 December 1938 - 15 March 1939 [p 1]
 Jaroslav Stránský: April 5, 1945 - November 6, 1945 [p 2]
 Prokop Drtin: November 6, 1945 - February 25, 1948
Alexej Čepička: 25 February 1948 - 25 April 1950
 Štefan Rais: April 25, 1950 - September 14, 1953
 Václav Škoda: September 14, 1953 - December 12, 1954
 Jan Bartuška: December 12, 1954 - June 16, 1956
 Václav Škoda: June 16, 1956 - July 11, 1960
 Alois Neuman: July 11, 1960 - April 8, 1968
 Bohuslav Kučera: April 8, 1968 - December 31, 1968

Ministers of Justice for the Czech Republic (1969-present) 

As part of the independent Republic

See also 

 Justice ministry
 Seznam ministrů spravedlnosti České republiky(List of Ministers of Justice of the Czech Republic)
 Seznam ministrů spravedlnosti Československa (List of Ministers of Justice of Czechoslovakia)
 Politics of the Czech Republic

References

External links
 in Czech  Ministerstvo spravedlnosti České republiky
 Prison Service of the Czech Republic
 Supreme Public Prosecutor’s Office of the Czech Republic
 Probation and Mediation Service of the Czech Republic

Czech Republic
Justice